A file is a military term for a number of troops drawn up in line ahead, i.e. one behind the other in a column. The number of files is the measure of the width of a column of troops in several ranks one behind the other.

Usage
Files are useful when troops don't know where the enemy is, since there are overlapping fields of fire from each soldier, and cover from a possible flanking attack. Files are at a disadvantage when there are heavy weapons nearby, supported by infantry, especially machine guns and tanks.

Ancient Greek use 
A file of men in the Greek phalanx was called a lochos and usually ranged from eight to sixteen men.

References

Bibliography 
 
 Duparcq, Edouard Le Barre (1863). Elements of Military Art and History: Comprising the History and Tactics of the Separate Arms; the Combination of the Arms; and the Minor Operations of War. D. Vand Nostrand. 
 Holbrook, John (1826). Military Tactics: Adapted to the Different Corps in the United States, According to the Latest Improvements. E. A. Clark. 
 McNab, Chris (2007). Combat Techniques: An Elite Forces Guide to Modern Infantry Tactics. Macmillan. 
 Schwartz, Richard B. (2008). Tactical Emergency Medicine. Williams & Wilkins.

Web sources
 

Tactical formations of the Napoleonic Wars
Tactical formations